The 1970 BYU Cougars football team was an American football team that represented Brigham Young University (BYU) as a member of the Western Athletic Conference (WAC) during the 1970 NCAA University Division football season. In their seventh season under head coach Tommy Hudspeth, the Cougars compiled an overall of 3–8 with a mark of 1–6 against conference opponents, finished seventh in the WAC, and were outscored by a total of 255 to 138.

Schedule

References

BYU
BYU Cougars football seasons
BYU Cougars football